Wild New World (also known as Prehistoric America) is a six-part BBC documentary series about Ice Age America that describes the prehistory, landscape and wildlife of the continent from the arrival of humans to the welcome of the Ice Age. It was first transmitted in the UK & JP on BBC Two from 3 October to 7 November 2002. Like several other BBC programmes, it contains both computer graphics and real-life animals. Occasionally, footage of non-American counterparts of the extinct North American beasts (like the American lion and the American cheetah) are used in juxtaposition with footage of native American animals, like the pronghorn.

Wild New World was co-produced by the BBC Natural History Unit and Discovery Channel. The music was composed by Barnaby Taylor and performed by the BBC Concert Orchestra. The series was narrated by Jack Fortune and produced by Miles Barton.

The series forms part of the Coordinator History Unit's Continents strand. It was preceded by Wild Africa in 2001 and followed by Wild Down Under in 2003.

Production
The series was announced by the BBC with the working title All American Animals, but it was later changed to Wild New World.

Episodes
All episode names were given from BBC website. All broadcast dates refer to the original UK transmission.

Each of the episode consists with the prehistory and wildlife of a particular region in the United States, except for final episode which is about various modern American animals.

Themes
The show's episodes offer several common themes, the main one being the coming of humans to America via the Ice Age's land bridge and causing the extinction of the North American megafauna featured in the episodes. Another BBC programme, Monsters We Met picks up and elaborates on this topic in greater detail. A more recent Discovery show, Prehistoric, also features scenic elements of Prehistoric America, such as the present melting away to reveal the past, as well as creatures already shown by the show, like the American mastodon, Arctodus and Columbian mammoth.

Merchandise

DVD
In United States and Canada, a two-disc DVD format was released under the title "Prehistoric America" on 7 September 2004 by BBC Warner. The series was included with two additional programmes:
 Grand Canyon – From Dinosaurs to Dams Everglades
 To Hell and Back Other: Fact Files Documentary

A three-disc DVD format was released in China for Region 6 on 12 June 2008 by Excel Media.

Books
In United Kingdom, an accompanying hardcover format was written by Miles Barton, Nigel Bean, Stephen Dunleavy, Ian Gray and Adam White, with foreword by D. Bruce Means. It was released on 19 September 2002 and published by BBC Worldwide.

The companion volume for the US market, Prehistoric America: A Journey through the Ice Age and Beyond, was published by the Yale University Press on 8 February 2003.()

See also 

 Ice Age Giants
 The Blue Planet
 Walking with Dinosaurs
 Walking with Beasts
 Walking with Monsters
 Walking with Cavemen
 Monsters We Met

References

External links 
 
 
Wild New World at Hulu

English-language films
BBC television documentaries about prehistoric and ancient history
Documentary films about nature
Documentary films about prehistoric life
Prehistory of North America
2000s British documentary television series
2002 British television series debuts
2002 British television series endings
Discovery Channel original programming